Carnegie is an abandoned townsite in section 6 of Rose Dell Township in Rock County, Minnesota, United States.

History
Carnegie was a community developed in competition with the town of Jasper.  Carnegie failed to attract sufficient investment and development, and as Jasper prospered, Carnegie's residents departed.  Today no trace of the community remains.

External Links
Vanished Towns of Rock County

References

Former populated places in Minnesota
Former populated places in Rock County, Minnesota